Joseph Anthony Vento (December 18, 1939 – August 23, 2011) was an American cook and restaurateur who founded  Geno's Steaks, a cheesesteak restaurant, in 1966, starting a longtime rivalry with neighboring restaurant, Pat's King of Steaks.

Early life
Joseph Anthony Vento, a third generation Italian American, was born in Philadelphia to Eva and James Vento. He dropped out of school in the 9th grade to assist his father in running a restaurant.

Restaurant business
Vento opened Geno's Steaks in 1966 on the corner of 9th and Passyunk, starting a longtime rivalry that is ongoing with Pat's King of Steaks. His restaurant is considered one of Philadelphia's Big Three cheesesteak establishments and is open 24/7.  Vento serves his cheesesteak without chopping the steak and believes provolone is the preferred cheese to be added.

Controversy
Vento has been accused of discrimination on multiple occasions against Hispanics and immigrants who had trouble speaking English. Vento's family and Geno's steaks has never officially apologized for the sign. Many people claim this is to not interfere with their business to anti immigration supporters. 

In 2006, his sign, which stated "This is AMERICA: WHEN ORDERING PLEASE SPEAK ENGLISH.", generated controversy and received attention from the Commission on Human Relations for possible violation of Philadelphia's ordinance due to discrimination on the basis of race, ethnicity, or sexual orientation. The ruling in 2008 stated the sign was not in violation of ordinance. Vento has denied accusations of racism, stating he has never turned away anyone on the basis of race or language but many locals of eastern Asian and Latin American descent have spoke of times where they have been refused service for ordering with an accent.

Death
Vento died of a heart attack on August 23, 2011 at his home in Shamong Township, New Jersey, at the age of 71. Ownership of Geno's Steak was passed to his son Geno, whom he named after the restaurant.

References

External links
 

American chefs
American male chefs
American people of Italian descent
1939 births
2011 deaths
People from Shamong Township, New Jersey